The flag of Naples is a vexillological symbol of the city of Naples, the capital of the Southern Italian region of Campania. The current flag representative of the city consists of two equal-sized rectangles, a golden yellow on the left and on the right side the colour is red.

Previously the flag of Naples meant a national flag during the times of the Kingdom of Naples, several different flags were used depending on who controlled the nation at the time. Perhaps the most prominent flags association with the kingdom are the original Angevin flag, the Bourbon flag and the senyera when the country was part of the Crown of Aragon.

History
Naples has had other flags in the past, including flags of the Kingdom of Naples.

After Naples was united with Sicily in 1442, the flag used the colours of Aragon. Starting in 1735, the flag of the Kingdom of Naples was green and white.

When Naples was part of the Parthenopaean Republic (1799), the flag had 3 vertical zones, blue, yellow and red. After 1806, the flag was split horizontally in white, red and black. Both horizontal and vertical versions were in use. This flag was used up to 1808.

When Joachim Murat was the king of Naples (1808–1815), the corners had 2 red and 2 black triangles; the coat of arms was inside a rhombus in the center. In 1811 Murat changed the flag to blue with a rectangle in the center whose border was checkered white and red. The coat of arms was on the left side of the rectangle (the civil flag had no coat of arms). From 1820 through 1821, the flag of Naples had 3 horizontal zones colored blue, black and red. The current flag has been in use since 1821.

Historical flags
Naples has formed the basis of Kingdoms and Republics during its history, below are some historical flags associated with Neapolitan domains.

References

Naples
Culture in Naples
History of Naples
Flags introduced in 1821